Ron E Sparks (born 4 March 1951) is an Australian radio personality and voice talent. Sparks was raised in Brisbane. Sparks now lives in the north Sydney suburb of Cammeray with his wife and two sons.

The "E" in his name "Ron E Sparks" does not stand for anything. It was originally added by program director Rod Muir, who thought that "Ronnie Sparx" sounded too immature, and wanted Sparks to transition gradually to using just "Ron" (which he has resisted doing).

Early career
Sparks worked in several regional radio stations before moving to Sydney in the 1970s, he managed to score a role on air at the then top rating AM station 2SM as "Ron E. Sparx", and quickly became one of Sydney's most respected announcers. He interviewed many stars of the day. He stated we had broader content in those days when discussing the Top 40 countdown, saying we played everything from AC/DC, Led Zeppelin to Barbra Streisand to Benny Hill's milkman song

After leaving 2SM Sparks became the program director of another Sydney AM station 2UW. After leaving 2UW he worked on top-rating FM station Triple M for almost 6 years before being lured to rival station 2Day FM.

Sparks has also made a name as a television voice artist, and has provided voice overs for several Australian television shows, such as Wheel of Fortune and Hot Streak. On the first day of October 1978, he hosted a special Rocktober edition of ABC-TV's Countdown.

Departure from 2Day FM
As 2Day FM grew more corporatised, and entered into the duopoly arrangement with Triple M, Sparks grew increasingly frustrated with group politics and had a hard time dealing with the huge egos of young network 'upstarts' who were given endless rope to play with. For some young 'stars' it seemed that they could do no wrong, and management always made excuses for them.

One particular gripe he had was with the night team (Kyle and Jackie O) smoking in the studio. This had been going on for some time, and despite it being illegal (2Day was in a high rise building, and smoking in the workplace is against Australian law), the general manager failed to take any action. One morning in 2001, Sparks arrived for his morning shift to find the studio smelling of stale smoke, and littered with used butts, some of which were floating in glasses of water. He cracked, and took a marker pen and wrote "No Smoking" on every physical object he could find in the studio.

Unfortunately, Sparks had used permanent marker, which destroyed several hundred dollars' worth of equipment, and he was sacked immediately following his shift that day. Sparks refused media interviews, even though the large majority agreed with him and applauded his actions. He toyed with the idea of legal action against 2Day but decided against it, in the interest of saving his career.

Sparks was only out of work for a day or two before being offered work at Nova 969 before being wooed by WSFM. He is currently retired after leaving WS in December 2017.

References

External links
WSFM Official Site
News story on Sparks' departure from 2Day FM
Ron E Sparks interview
2013 Interview with Australian Programmer Greg Smith on Radio Today website

Living people
1952 births
Australian media personalities
People from Brisbane